Atlantic City is a city in New Jersey, United States.

Atlantic City may also refer to:

Places
Eko Atlantic (Atlantic City Africa)
Atlantic City, Wyoming, a census-designated place in Wyoming, United States
"Atlantic-City", a business center in Primorsky District, Saint Petersburg

Transportation
 Atlantic City catboat, an American sailboat design
 Atlantic City Express (Amtrak train), a former Amtrak train service 
 Atlantic City Express Service, a former train service linking New York City with Atlantic City
 Atlantic City Expressway, a toll road in South Jersey 
 Atlantic City International Airport, an airport in Egg Harbor Township, New Jersey
 Atlantic City Line, a train service also in South Jersey 
 Atlantic City Rail Terminal, a train station in Atlantic City, New Jersey

Arts, entertainment, and media
Atlantic City (1944 film), a musical film
Atlantic City (1980 film), a drama film
"Atlantic City", a 1986 episode of the TV series The Facts of Life
"Atlantic City", a 2006 episode of the TV series How I Met Your Mother
"Atlantic City" (song), a 1982 song by Bruce Springsteen

Other uses
Atlantic City (minor league baseball), two minor league baseball teams that represented Atlantic City, New Jersey
 Atlantic City Mercantile, an historic building in Atlantic City, Wyoming

See also

 Atlantic County, New Jersey, USA
 
 Atlantic (disambiguation)